Neal Eugene Mehring (March 1, 1910 – January 10, 1995) was an American football player and coach. He was the fourth head football coach at Adams State College—now known as Adams State University—in Alamosa, Colorado, serving for two seasons, from 1946 to 1947, and compiled a record of 11–4.

Head coaching record

References

External links
 

1910 births
1995 deaths
American football guards
Adams State Grizzlies football coaches
Nebraska Cornhuskers football coaches
Nebraska Cornhuskers football players
People from Hall County, Nebraska